This is a list of streams and rivers of the U.S. state of New Jersey.

List of New Jersey rivers includes streams formally designated as rivers.  There are also smaller streams (i.e., branches, creeks, drains, forks, licks, runs, etc.) in the state.  Major rivers include the Manasquan, Maurice, Mullica, Passaic, Rahway, Raritan, Musconetcong, Hudson and Delaware rivers.  Historically, the Delaware and Raritan rivers have provided transportation of goods and people inland from the Atlantic Ocean, and were once connected by the Delaware and Raritan Canal.  Today, these rivers, and the streams that feed them, provide sport and recreation for many people.

By drainage basin

Hudson River Basin

North River (Lower Hudson)
Hudson River
Sparkill Creek
Rondout Creek (NY)
Wallkill River
Pochuck Creek
Black Creek
Wawayanda Creek
Papakating Creek
Clove Brook
Neepaulakating Creek
West Branch Papakating Creek

Newark Bay
Kill Van Kull (tidal strait)
Hackensack River
Penhorn Creek
Sawmill Creek
Berrys Creek
Mill Creek
Cromakill Creek
Bellmans Creek
Losen Slofe
Overpeck Creek
Pascack Brook
Bear Brook 
Musquapsink Brook
Dwars Kill

Passaic River
First River (a.k.a. Mill Brook tributary)
Second River
Toney's Brook
Nishuane Brook
Parrow Brook
Wigwam Brook
Third River
Yantacaw Brook
Saddle River
Ho-Ho-Kus Brook
Fleischer Brook
Little Diamond Brook
Diamond Brook
Stevenson Brook
Goffle Brook
Deep Voll Brook
Molly Ann Brook
Squaw Brook
Slippery Rock Brook
Peckman River
Deepavaal Brook
Pompton River
Ramapo River
Mahwah River
Pequannock River
Wanaque River
Rockaway River
Den Brook
Whippany River
Foulerton's Brook
Spring Garden Brook
Slough Brook
Canoe Brook
Salt Brook
Cory's Brook
Dead River
Black Brook
Great Brook
Primrose Brook
Loantaka Brook
Penns Brook
Indian Grove Brook
Naakpunkt Brook

Raritan River Basin

Raritan River
Bound Brook
Ambrose Brook
Green Brook
Blue Brook
Bonygutt Brook
Stony Brook
Crab Brook
Cedar Brook
Crows Mill Creek
Cuckholds Brook
Dukes Brook
Garron Creek
Lawrence Brook
Beaverdam Brook
Great Ditch
Ireland Brook
Oakeys Brook
Cow Yard Brook
Sawmill Brook 
Sucker Brook
Terhune Run
Unnamed Brook in Rutgers Gardens, unofficially named Doc Brook
Unnamed Brook in Rutgers' Helyar Woods
Middle Brook
Mile Run
Mill Brook
Millstone River
Beden Brook
Cherry Run
Pike Run
Pine Tree Run
Back Brook
Branch Back Brook
Cruser Brook
Roaring Brook
Rock Brook
Cat Tail Brook
Bear Brook
Cranbury Brook
Cedar Brook
Devils Brook
Shallow Brook
Harrys Brook
Heathcote Brook
Carters Brook
Heathcote Brook Branch
Indian Run Brook
Little Bear Brook
Millstone Brook
Peace Brook
Rocky Brook
Timber Run
Royce Brook
Simonson Brook
Six Mile Run
Cross Brook
Middlebush Brook
Nine Mile Run
Steep Hill Brook
Stony Brook
Baldwins Creek
Duck Pond Run
Honey Branch
Lewis Brook
Peters Brook (Stony Brook tributary)
Stony Brook Branch
Woodsville Brook
Ten Mile Run
Van Horn Brook
North Branch Raritan River
Black River
Burnett Brook
Chambers Brook
Chamber's Brook
Clucas Brook
India Brook
Lamington River
Bamboo Brook
Cold Brook
Rockaway Creek
Tanners Brook
Larger Brook
McVickers Brook
Middle Brook (Bedminster)
Mine Brook
Moggy Brook
Peapack Brook
Penns Brook
Stewart Brook
Padilla Creek
Prescott Canal)
Prescott Brook
Prescott Creek
Red Root Creek
South Branch Raritan River
Allerton Creek
Assicong Creek
Beaver Brook
Bushkill Brook
Campbell's Brook
Capoolong Creek
Cramers Creek
Drakes Brook
Electric Brook
Holland Brook
Little Brook
Minneaconing Creek
Neshanic River
Pleasant Run
Spruce Run
Mulhockaway Creek
Stony Brook (Washington Township - Morris County)
Sidney Brook
Turkey Brook
South River
Deep Run
Duck Creek
Manalapan Brook
Matchaponix Brook
Barclay Brook
McGellairds Brook
Pine Brook
Weamaconk Creek
Pond Creek
Tennents Brook

Atlantic Coast
Arthur Kill (tidal strait)
Elizabeth River
Morses Creek
Piles Creek
Rahway River
Marshes Creek
South Branch
Robinsons Branch
Pumpkin Patch Brook
Smith Creek
Woodbridge River (Also known as Woodbridge Creek)
Wedgewood Brook
Heards Brook
Navesink River
Swimming River
Shrewsbury River
Shark River
Manasquan River
Yellow Brook
Metedeconk River
North Branch Metedeconk River
South Branch Metedeconk River
Toms River
Union Branch
Ridgeway Branch
Cedar Creek
Forked River
Oyster Creek
Westecunk Creek
Mullica River
Ballanger Creek
Big Graveling Creek (tidal channel)
Nacote Creek
Bass River
Wading River
Oswego River
Tulpehocken Creek
West Branch Wading River
Turtle Creek
Landing Creek
Batsto River
Nescochague Creek
Mechescatauxin Branch
Albertson Brook
Blue Anchor Brook
Pump Branch
Great Swamp Brook
Abescon Creek
Great Egg Harbor River
Patcong Creek
Tuckahoe River
Cedar Swamp Creek
English Creek
Stephen Creek
South River
Hospitality Branch
Kettle Creek

Delaware Bay

Dennis Creek
Roaring Ditch
Sluice Creek
East Creek
West Creek
Maurice River
Muskee Creek
Manumuskin River
Manantico Creek
Muddy Run
Scotland Run
Still Run
Little Ease Run
Dividing Creek
Fishing Creek
Fulling Mill Stream
Oranoaken Creek
Nantuxent Creek
Cedar Creek
Back Creek
Ogden Creek
Abbots Creek
Cohansey River
Stow Creek
Mad Horse Creek
Hope Creek
Alloway Creek
Salem River
Fenwick Creek
Mannington Creek
Game Creek

Delaware River Basin

Delaware River
Oldmans Creek
Raccoon Creek
Repaupo Creek
Mantua Creek
Woodbury Creek
Big Timber Creek
Cooper River
Pennsauken Creek
Rancocas Creek
North Branch Rancocas Creek
Greenwood Branch
Bisphams Mill Creek
Pole Bridge Branch
Mount Misery Brook
South Branch Rancocas Creek
Friendship Creek
Burrs Mill Brook
Southwest Branch Rancocas Creek
Sharps Run
Little Creek
Assiscunk Creek
Barkers Brook
Crafts Creek
Blacks Creek
Crosswicks Creek
Back Creek
Doctors Creek
Assunpink Creek
Shabakunk Creek
Shipetaukin Creek
Jacobs Creek
Fiddlers Creek
Moores Creek
Swan Creek
Alexauken Creek
Wickecheoke Creek
Lockatong Creek
Nishisakawick Creek
Harihokake Creek
Hakihokake Creek
Musconetcong River
 Lubbers Run
 Punkhorn Creek
Pohatcong Creek
Lopatcong Creek
Pequest River
Beaver Brook
Bear Creek
Paulins Kill 
Flat Brook
Big Flat Brook
Little Flat Brook

Alphabetic list

Abbots Creek
Absecon Creek
Albertson Brook
Alexauken Creek
Alloway Creek
Ambrose Brook
Arthur Kill (tidal strait)
Assiscunk Creek
Assunpink Creek
Back Brook (New Jersey)
Back Creek
Back Creek
Baldwins Creek
Ballanger Creek
Barkers Brook
Bass River
Batsto River
Bear Brook (Millstone River tributary)
Bear Brook (Pascack Brook tributary)
Bear Creek
Beaver Brook
Beaverdam Brook
Beden Brook
Berrys Creek
Big Flat Brook
Big Graveling Creek (tidal channel)
Big Timber Creek
Birch Swamp Brook
Bisphams Mill Creek
Black Brook (Passaic River tributary)
Black Brook (Whippany River tributary)
Black Creek
Black River
Blacks Creek
Blue Brook
Bonygutt Brook
Bound Brook
Branch Back Brook
Burrs Mill Brook
Canoe Brook
Carters Brook
Cat Tail Brook
Cedar Brook
Cedar Creek (Barnegat Bay)
Cedar Creek (Delaware Bay)
Cedar Swamp Creek
Clove Brook
Cohansey River
Cooper River
Cory's Brook
Crab Brook
Crafts Creek
Cranbury Brook
Cross Brook
Crosswicks Creek
Cruser Brook
Cow Yard Brook
Dead River
Deep Voll Brook
Deepavaal Brook
Deep Run Brook
Delaware River
Dennis Creek
Devils Brook
Diamond Brook
Dividing Creek
Doctors Creek
Duck Pond Run
Dwars Kill
East Creek
Elizabeth River
English Creek
Fenwick Creek
Fiddlers Creek
First River or Mill Brook
Fishing Creek
Flat Brook
Fleischer Brook
Foulerton's Brook
Friendship Creek
Fulling Mill Stream
Game Creek
Goffle Brook
Great Brook
Great Ditch
Great Egg Harbor River
Great Swamp Brook
Green Brook
Greenwood Branch
Hackensack River
Hakihokake Creek
Harihokake Creek
Harrys Brook
Heards Brook
Heathcote Brook
Heathcote Brook Branch
Honey Branch
Ho-Ho-Kus Brook
Holland Brook
Hope Creek
Hospitality Branch
Hudson River
Indian Grove Brook
Ireland Brook
Jacobs Creek
Kill Van Kull (tidal strait)
Lamington River
Landing Creek
Lawrence Brook
Lewis Brook
Little Bear Brook
Little Diamond Brook
Little Egg Harbor River
Little Ease Run
Little Flat Brook
Lockatong Creek
Lopatcong Creek
Lubbers Run
Mad Horse Creek
Mahwah River
Manalapan Brook
Manantico Creek
Manasquan River
Mannington Creek
Mantua Creek
Manumuskin River
Marshes Creek
Matawan Creek
Matchaponix Brook
Maurice River
Metedeconk River
Middle Brook
Middlebush Brook
Mill Brook or First River
Mile Run
Millstone River
Molly Ann Brook
Moores Creek
Mount Misery Brook
Morses Creek
Muddy Run
Mullica River
Musconetcong River
Muskee Creek
Musquapsink Brook
Naakpunkt Brook
Nacote Creek
Nantuxent Creek
Navesink River
Neepaulakating Creek
Negro Run
Nescochague Creek
Neshanic River
Nine Mile Run
Nishayne Brook
Nishisakawick Creek
Nomahegan Brook
North Branch Metedeconk River
North Branch Rancocas Creek
North Branch Raritan River
North River
Oakeys Brook
Ogden Creek
Oldmans Creek
Oranoaken Creek
Oswego River
Overpeck Creek
Oyster Creek
Papakating Creek
Parrow Brook
Pascack Brook
Passaic River
Patcong Creek
Paulins Kill
Peckman River
Penns Brook
Pennsauken Creek
Pequannock River
Pequest River
Peters Brook (Stony Brook tributary)
Peters Brook (Raritan River tributary)
Pike Run
Pine Tree Run
Pochuck Creek
Pohatcong Creek
Pole Bridge Branch
Pompton River
Pump Branch
Punkhorn Creek
Raccoon Creek
Rahway River
Ramapo River
Randolph Brook
Rancocas Creek
Raritan River
Repaupo Creek
Ridgeway Branch
Roaring Brook
Roaring Ditch
Rock Brook
Rockaway Creek
Rockaway River
Rocky Brook
Royce Brook
Saddle River
Salem River
Sawmill Brook
Scotland Run
Second River
Shabakunk Creek
Shallow Brook
Shark River
Shipetaukin Creek
Shrewsbury River
Simonson Brook
Six Mile Run
Slippery Rock Brook
Slough Brook
Sluice Creek
Smith Creek
South Branch Metedeconk River
South Branch Rancocas Creek
South Branch Raritan River
South River (Great Egg Harbor River tributary)
South River (Raritan River tributary)
Southwest Branch Rancocas Creek
Sparkill Creek
Spring Garden Brook
Squaw Brook
Steep Hill Brook
Stephen Creek
Stevenson Brook
Still Run
Stony Brook (Green Brook tributary)
Stony Brook (Millstone River tributary)
Stony Brook Branch
Stow Creek
Sucker Brook
Swan Creek
Swimming River
Ten Mile Run
Terhune Run
Third River
Timber Run
Toms River
Toney's Brook
Tuckahoe River
Tulpehocken Creek
Turtle Creek
Union Branch
Wading River
Wallkill River
Wanaque River
Wawayanda Creek
West Branch Wading River
West Creek
Westecunk Creek
Whippany River
Wickecheoke Creek
Wigwam Brook
Woodbridge Creek
Woodbury Creek
Woodsville Brook
Yantacaw Brook
Yellow River

See also
List of waterways
List of rivers in the United States
List of canals in the United States

External links
AllRefer.com Reference Pages
American Whitewater: NJ Rivers
FlyFishingConnection.com
Gorp, a guide to National Parks
New Jersey Streamflow Data from the USGS
Gloucester County Watershed Basins

New Jersey
 
Rivers